Burgruine Hohenegg is a castle located in Dunkelsteinerwald, Lower Austria.

References

External links 

 https://web.archive.org/web/20120828044211/http://altemauern.heimat.eu/n_hohenegg.htm

Castles in Lower Austria